Croatia participated in the Eurovision Song Contest 2002 with the song "Everything I Want" written by Milana Vlaović. The song was performed by Vesna Pisarović. The Croatian broadcaster Croatian Radiotelevision (HRT) organised the national final Dora 2002 to select the Croatian entry for the 2002 contest in Tallinn, Estonia. Twenty entries competed in the national final on 10 March 2002 and "Sasvim sigurna" performed by Vesna Pisarović was selected as the winner following the combination of votes from five regional juries, a six-member expert jury, a regional televote and an online vote. The song was later translated from Croatian to English for the Eurovision Song Contest and was titled "Everything I Want".

Croatia competed in the Eurovision Song Contest which took place on 25 May 2002. Performing during the show in position 6, Croatia placed eleventh out of the 24 participating countries, scoring 44 points.

Background 

The nation's best result in the contest was fourth, which it achieved on two occasions: in 1996 with the song "Sveta ljubav" performed by Maja Blagdan and in 1999 with the song "Marija Magdalena" performed by Doris Dragović. In 2001, Croatia placed tenth with Vanna and the song "Strings of My Heart".

The Croatian national broadcaster, Croatian Radiotelevision (HRT), broadcasts the event within Croatia and organises the selection process for the nation's entry. Since 1993, HRT organised the national final Dora in order to select the Croatian entry for the Eurovision Song Contest, a method that was continued for their 2002 participation.

Before Eurovision

Dora 2002 
Dora 2002 was the tenth edition of the Croatian national selection Dora which selected Croatia's entry for the Eurovision Song Contest 2002. The competition consisted of twenty entries competing in one final on 10 March 2002 at Pavilion 5 of the Zagreb Fair in Zagreb, hosted by Dusko Ćurlić and Bojana Gregorić. The show was broadcast on HTV1 as well as online via the broadcaster's website hrt.hr.

Competing entries 
On 14 November 2001, HRT opened a submission period where artists and composers were able to submit their entries to the broadcaster with the deadline on 5 January 2002. Artists were required to be signed to record companies in order to participate in the competition. 203 entries were received by the broadcaster during the submission period. An eleven-member expert committee reviewed the received submissions and selected twenty artists and songs for the competition. HRT announced the competing entries on 25 January 2002 and among the artists was Goran Karan who represented Croatia in the Eurovision Song Contest 2000.

Final 
The final took place on 10 March 2002. All songs were performed with HRT's Revijski Orchestra and the winner, "Sasvim sigurna" performed by Vesna Pisarović, was determined by a combination of votes from four regional juries, an expert jury, a public televote which was divided into four telephone regions in Croatia and online voting. In addition to the performances of the competing entries, Ivana Spagna and Vanna performed as the interval acts during the show.

Preparation 
Following consultation with music and industry experts as well as taking the results of public researches and a public televote held between 13 and 18 March into consideration, it was decided by HRT that "Sasvim sigurna" would be performed in English at the Eurovision Song Contest entitled "Everything I Want".

At Eurovision
According to Eurovision rules, all nations with the exceptions of the bottom six countries in the 2001 contest competed in the final on 25 May 2002. On 9 November 2001, a special allocation draw was held which determined the running order and Croatia was set to perform in position 6, following the entry from Spain and before the entry from Russia. Croatia finished in eleventh place with 44 points.

The show was broadcast in Croatia on HTV1. The Croatian spokesperson, who announced the Croatian votes during the final, was Duško Ćurlić.

Voting
Below is a breakdown of points awarded to Croatia and awarded by Croatia in the contest. The nation awarded its 12 points to Malta in the contest.

References

External links
 Dora 2002 at the HRT website 
 Dora 2002 at the Eurofest Croatia website 

2002
Countries in the Eurovision Song Contest 2002
Eurovision